Falémé is a commune in the Cercle of Kayes in the Kayes Region of south-western Mali. The main town (chef-lieu) is Diboli. In 2009 the commune had a population of 10,112.

References

External links
.

Communes of Kayes Region